James Mayall (8 January 1856 – 13 September 1916) was an English cricketer. He was a wicket-keeper who played for Lancashire. He was born and died in Oldham, Lancashire.

Mayall made his only first-class appearance against Gloucestershire in 1885. A tailend batsman, he was bowled out for a duck in the only innings in which he batted.  He made one catch and two stumpings.

Mayall also played for several Oldham teams in miscellaneous matches between 1878 and 1886.

References

1856 births
1916 deaths
English cricketers
Lancashire cricketers
People from Oldham